4-Methylpyridine is the organic compound with the formula CH3C5H4N. It is one of the three isomers of methylpyridine. This pungent liquid is a building block for the synthesis of other heterocyclic compounds.  Its conjugate acid, the 4-methylpyridinium ion, has a pKa of 5.98, about 0.7 units above that of pyridine itself.

Production and uses
4-Methylpyridine is both isolated from coal tar and is synthesized industrially.  It forms via the reaction of acetaldehyde and ammonia in the presence of an oxide catalyst.  The method also affords some 2-methylpyridine.

4-Methylpyridine is of little intrinsic value but is a precursor to other commercially significant species, often of medicinal interest. For example, ammoxidation of 4-methylpyridine gives 4-cyanopyridine, the precursor to a variety of other derivatives such as the antituberculosis drug isoniazid.

Toxicity
Like most alkylpyridines, the LD50 of 2-methylpyridine is modest, being 1290 mg/kg (oral, rat).

References 

4-Pyridyl compounds